Nidelva is a river in Trondheim Municipality in Trøndelag county, Norway.

Location
The Nidelva starts at the Hyttfossen waterfall which rises from Bjørsjøen, a small lake located just below Selbusjøen, the largest lake in the southern part of Trøndelag County. The Nidelva runs north through Klæbu, then to Tiller, and then through the city of Trondheim before reaching Trondheimsfjord by the island of Brattøra near Trondheim Central Station. The Nidelva is at its deepest at the Trongfossen, a deep ravine in the village of Klæbu. There are six hydro-electric power stations along the river. The Nidelva forms the last part of the Nea-Nidelvvassdraget watershed. The Nea River is a tributary which empties into Selbusjøen, which in turn flows into the Nidelva.

The popular Norwegian waltz, Nidelven Stille og Vakker du er, was  written by composer Oskar Hoddø (1916–1943). According to tradition, Hoddø wrote the waltz about the Nidelva River one night in late April 1940 while he was standing at Gamle Bybro in Trondheim.

Media gallery

References

Other sources

External links

Rivers of Trøndelag
Geography of Trondheim
Klæbu
Rivers of Norway